The 2017–18 Scottish League Two (known as Ladbrokes League Two for sponsorship reasons) was the 23rd season in the current format of 10 teams in the fourth-tier of Scottish football. The last placed team entered a play-off with a team nominated by the Scottish Football Association from outside the SPFL determining which team enters League Two in the 2018–19 season. The fixtures were published on 23 June 2017.

Ten teams contested the league: Annan Athletic, Berwick Rangers, Clyde, Cowdenbeath, Edinburgh City, Elgin City, Montrose, Peterhead, Stenhousemuir and Stirling Albion.

Prize money
In April 2018, the SPFL confirmed the prize money to be allocated to the league members at the conclusion of the competitions. The League Two winners would receive £64,000 with a total pot of £24.5 million to be distributed across the four divisions.

Teams
The following teams changed division since the 2016–17 season.

To League Two

Relegated from Scottish League One
 Peterhead
 Stenhousemuir

From League Two

Promoted to Scottish League One
 Arbroath
 Forfar Athletic

Stadia and locations

Personnel and kits

Managerial changes

League summary

League table

Positions by round
The table lists the positions of teams after each week of matches. In order to preserve chronological progress, any postponed matches are not included in the round at which they were originally scheduled, but added to the full round they were played immediately afterwards. For example, if a match is scheduled for matchday 13, but then postponed and played between days 16 and 17, it will be added to the standings for day 16.

Source:  
Updated: 28 April 2018

Results
Teams play each other four times, twice in the first half of the season (home and away) and twice in the second half of the season (home and away), making a total of 180 games, with each team playing 36.

First half of season

Second half of season

Season statistics

Scoring

Top scorers

Hat-tricks

Discipline

Player

Yellow cards

Red cards

Club

Yellow cards

Red cards

Attendances

Awards

Monthly awards

League Two play-offs
The first round was contested between the winners of the 2017–18 Highland Football League (Cove Rangers) and the 2017–18 Lowland Football League (Spartans). The winners then played against the bottom club in League Two, and would have been promoted to League Two for the 2018–19 season if they had won.

Due to fixture congestion in the Highland League preventing a champion being crowned in time, the dates for the first round were pushed back a week.

First round

First leg

Second leg

Second round

First leg

Second leg

References

Scottish League Two seasons
4
4
Scot